Shannon Rubicam (born October 11, 1951) is an American singer-songwriter who is best known for being half of the mid-to-late-1980s pop duo Boy Meets Girl.

Her husband, George Merrill, was the other half of Boy Meets Girl, best known for their 1988 hit "Waiting for a Star to Fall". Merrill and Rubicam first met in 1975 when both were performing at a friend's wedding. The couple also wrote two hit songs for Whitney Houston, "How Will I Know" and "I Wanna Dance with Somebody (Who Loves Me)", both of which hit Number 1 in the United States, among other countries, during the second half of the 1980s, just before Boy Meets Girl shot to fame.

Merrill and Rubicam have one child, a daughter named Hilary, who appeared in their "Waiting for a Star to Fall" video as the young blonde-haired girl.  They divorced in 2000 but have continued working together for various music projects.

In 2011, Rubicam published her first novel, titled The Wonderground.

References

External links 
Biography

Living people
1951 births
American women songwriters
Musicians from Seattle
Boy Meets Girl members
20th-century American singers
21st-century American singers
20th-century American women singers
21st-century American women singers